Boy Cried Wolf is the fourth studio album by the British rock group the Feeling. It is available as a standard CD, a double CD featuring an extra disc of jam sessions and studio out-takes recorded "in the Doghouse", and a deluxe box set including the 2 CDs, a 180g vinyl version of the album, an exclusive DVD, and a songbook containing sheet music for selected songs on the record.

An exclusive acoustic version of the album track "I Just Do" was made available as a free download from the band's official website.

It debuted at number 33 on the UK Album Chart on 13 October 2013 with the first two singles from the album, "Rescue" and "Blue Murder" (retitled on the single release as "Boy Cried Wolf"), A-listed by the UK Radio station BBC Radio 2. The album also received critical acclaim.

Boy Cried Wolf is something of a concept album, focusing on lead singer Dan Gillespie-Sells's break up from a five-year relationship. The band's website states that the first song written for the album was "You'll See", with the song being written upon returning home following the break-up.

Music videos were produced for the tracks "Blue Murder", "Rescue", "Fall Like Rain" and "Empty Restaurant".

The helicopter used in filming was a Bell 47G, registration G-MASH, flown by David “Madboy” Goodman. 
Cover shot taken at threshold of runway 26, Elstree Aerodrome (EGTR)

Critical reception

The album received generally positive reviews. Q and Sunday Times Culture both called it the best album of the band's career. It also received a 9/10 rating from Holy Moly.

Track listing

Personnel
 Dan Gillespie-Sells – lead vocals, guitar
 Richard Jones – bass guitar, vocals
 Kevin Jeremiah – lead guitar, vocals
 Ciaran Jeremiah – keyboards, vocals
 Paul Stewart – drums

Charts

References

The Feeling albums
2013 albums
Albums produced by Seton Daunt